Adeshola Mos-Shogbamimu ( Babington-Ashaye) is a British-Nigerian lawyer and academic, notable as an activist and political commentator.  She frequently comments on women's rights, law, politics, diversity, inequality and exclusion. Her debut book, This is Why I Resist, was described in The Telegraph as "an unapologetic declaration that black identity will no longer be defined by white supremacy, and an unfettered call to action to revolutionise the narrative around the black experience in our day-to-day lives."

Biography

Early life and education
Adeshola Babington-Ashaye was born in Hackney, London on November 13, 1975.  She was raised in London, Nigeria, and the United States, and lived in East Africa when her mother was working for the Commonwealth of Nations. Speaking of how she has been influenced by her Nigerian heritage, she has said: "My parents brought me up with a really strong identity of who I am and so I have never felt inferior due to the colour of my skin, being a woman or gender. I would use the word feminist to describe my father.  He was the first male feminist I knew."

At the age of 19 she obtained her first degree, an honours LLB, from the University of Buckingham, going on to earn an MA degree in Diplomatic Studies from the University of Westminster, an LLM degree in Commercial & Corporate Law from the London School of Economics, a PhD in Law from Birkbeck, University of London, and an Executive MBA from the University of Cambridge.

Career
Mos-Shogbamimu is an attorney in New York, and a solicitor in England and Wales. She has worked in international finance.

Role as commentator, and impact
In June 2020 Vogue magazine named her among "8 Educational Black Voices To Listen And Learn From Now".  She is the founder of the magazine Women in Leadership. She appears on television as a commentator on issues related to politics, current affairs, race and diversity. She has been particularly outspoken about what she perceives to be the negative media treatment of "women of colour" who are in the public eye, such as Serena Williams and Meghan Markle. In 2019 Mos-Shogbamimu delivered a TEDx Talk entitled "This is why I resist", in which she explained why she refuses to be defined by the colour of her skin, her gender or religion, engaging her audience with her views on feminism and politics, and encouragement to join her "conscious revolution". In March 2021 she engaged with Piers Morgan in a debate as a guest on Good Morning Britain discussing the Oprah with Meghan and Harry interview.

Publication
Her first book, This Is Why I Resist: Don't Define My Black Identity, was published in January 2021.  It aimed to address the nuances and intricacies of "race, racism and race inclusion" terminology.

Death threats
On 20 February 2023, Mos-Shogbamimu reported that she had received a "chilling" letter, ostensibly from the proscribed neo-Nazi terrorist group National Action that contained death threats directed at herself and her family, the same day transgender television personality India Willoughby reported receiving a similarly threatening letter from the same group. The following day, it was announced the Metropolitan Police's counter-terrorism command had launched an investigation into the threats.

Personal life
Shola Mos-Shogbamimu is married and has three daughters. She is a Christian.

Bibliography
 This Is Why I Resist: Don't Define My Black Identity, London: Headline, 2021, .

References

External links
 
 Isobel Lewis, "Piers Morgan branded a 'petty, fragile man baby' by GMB guest over Meghan Markle comment", The Independent, 22 February 2021.

1975 births
British people of Nigerian descent
Alumni of the University of Buckingham
Alumni of the London School of Economics
Alumni of the University of Westminster
Alumni of Birkbeck, University of London
Alumni of the University of Cambridge
Black British activists
Black British women writers
British political commentators
Living people